Buffaloland Provincial Park is a provincial park in Prince Edward Island, Canada. It is home to a bison sanctuary. 

In 1973, the province of Alberta gifted the province of Prince Edward Island a herd of 15 bison. The bison have served as a tourist attraction for Prince Edward Island since then. In 2014, the government transferred the park to the Buddhist charity Moonlight International. Prior to this transfer, the government had been spending $40,000 annually on operating costs. In 2014, there were 38 bison in the park. In 2018, there were 56 bison in the park, partly due to the Buddhist belief in not harming animals.

References

The buffalo that reside at Buffaloland park in the Kings county region of PEI were originally a gift from the province of Alberta in the 1970s. 
Currently there are between 50 and 60 buffalo that roam the 40 hectare fenced area. 
The park was run by the provincial government but is now run by the Moonlight Society, a buddhist organization.

Provincial parks of Prince Edward Island
Parks in Kings County, Prince Edward Island

Bison herds